Slavonian may refer to:

 something of, or related to Slavonia
 Slavonian dialect, a Slavic dialect spoken in parts of Slavonia
 historical name used in some sources for the Serbo-Croatian pluricentric language in Slavonia

See also
 
 
 Slavonia (disambiguation)